"Miracle Power" is a song by We the Kingdom that was released as the lead single from their eponymously-titled second studio album on May 27, 2022. The song was written by Ed Cash, Scott Cash, Franni Cash, Martin Cash, and Andrew Bergthold.

"Miracle Power" peaked at No. 15 on the US Hot Christian Songs chart.

Background
On May 27, 2022, We the Kingdom released "Miracle Power" as a single, accompanied with its live music video. The band also announced that "Miracle Power" is the lead single to their forthcoming second studio album. "Miracle Power" was released to Christian radio stations in the United States on June 24, 2022.

Composition

Commercial performance
"Miracle Power" debuted at No. 32 on the US Hot Christian Songs chart dated June 11, 2022, concurrently charting at No. 5 on the Christian Digital Song Sales chart.

Music video
The live music video of "Miracle Power" was by We the Kingdom released on May 27, 2022, through YouTube.

Charts

Weekly charts

Year-end charts

Release history

References

External links
  on PraiseCharts

2022 songs
2022 singles
We the Kingdom songs
Songs written by Ed Cash